Maximum Weight Convention, 1967 is  an International Labour Organization Convention.

It was established in 1967, with the preamble stating:
Having decided upon the adoption of certain proposals with regard to maximum permissible weight to be carried by one worker,...

Ratifications
As of 2013, the convention was ratified by 29 countries.

References

External links 
Text.
Ratifications.

Health treaties
International Labour Organization conventions
Treaties concluded in 1967
Treaties entered into force in 1970
Treaties of Algeria
Treaties of the military dictatorship in Brazil
Treaties of the People's Republic of Bulgaria
Treaties of Chile
Treaties of Ecuador
Treaties of Costa Rica
Treaties of France
Treaties of Guatemala
Treaties of Honduras
Treaties of Hungary
Treaties of India
Treaties of Italy
Treaties of Lebanon
Treaties of Lithuania
Treaties of Luxembourg
Treaties of Madagascar
Treaties of Malta
Treaties of Nicaragua
Treaties of Panama
Treaties of Peru
Treaties of the Polish People's Republic
Treaties of Portugal
Treaties of the Socialist Republic of Romania
Treaties of Francoist Spain
Treaties of Thailand
Treaties of Tunisia
Treaties of Turkey
Treaties of Venezuela
Occupational safety and health treaties
1967 in labor relations